Sallie Davis Hayden (July 12, 1842 – September 15, 1907) was a suffragist in the Arizona Territory of the United States.

Biography
Sarah Calvert “Sallie” Davis  was born near Forrest City, Arkansas, on July 12, 1842, to Cornelius Davis and Eliza Halbert. She was a school teacher in Visalia, California, when she met Arizona businessman Charles Trumbull Hayden (1825–1900) whom she married on October 4, 1876. Sallie served briefly as postmaster of Hayden's Ferry, Arizona which was later named Tempe.

Sallie was interested in politics and hosted suffragist speakers in her home at Hayden's Ferry. Along with Josephine Brawley Hughes and Frances Willard Munds, Sallie was one of the founders of the suffrage movement in Arizona.

Sallie was the mother of  United States Senator Carl Hayden (1877–1972), elected in 1912 as the first Representative from Arizona. In 1913, in honor of his mother, Carl introduced a joint resolution calling for women's suffrage.

References

External links
 

1842 births
1907 deaths
American suffragists
Arizona pioneers
People from Tempe, Arizona
People from St. Francis County, Arkansas
19th-century American women